Prague was captured and sacked twice in the Thirty Years' War, right at the start, and right at the end:

in 1620 by Habsburg troops, after the Battle of White Mountain
in 1648 by Swedish troops, after the Battle of Prague (1648); they did not capture the whole city - this is the more likely reference.

Thirty Years' War